Ulysse de Pauw (born 3 September 2001) is a Belgian professional racing driver who is scheduled to compete in the FIA World Endurance Championship with AF Corse. A race-winner in both French F4 and BRDC British F3 in his junior career, he is the reigning GT World Challenge Europe Sprint Cup Silver Cup champion, having led his team to two overall poles and wins in the process.

Racing record

Racing career summary 

† As de Pauw was a guest driver, he was ineligible to score points.

Complete French F4 Championship results 
(key) (Races in bold indicate pole position) (Races in italics indicate fastest lap)

Complete BRDC British Formula 3 Championship results
(key) (Races in bold indicate pole position) (Races in italics indicate fastest lap)

Complete GT World Challenge results

GT World Challenge Europe Endurance Cup 
(Races in bold indicate pole position) (Races in italics indicate fastest lap)

GT World Challenge Europe Sprint Cup 
(key) (Races in bold indicate pole position) (Races in italics indicate fastest lap)

Complete FIA World Endurance Championship results 
(key) (Races in bold indicate pole position) (Races in italics indicate fastest lap)

References

External links 
 

2001 births
Living people
Belgian racing drivers
French F4 Championship drivers
BRDC British Formula 3 Championship drivers
European Le Mans Series drivers
British GT Championship drivers
WeatherTech SportsCar Championship drivers
FIA World Endurance Championship drivers
24 Hours of Le Mans drivers
AF Corse drivers
W Racing Team drivers